Fulvoclysia forsteri is a species of moth of the family Tortricidae. It is found in the Elburz Mountains of northern Iran.

References

Moths described in 1938
Cochylini